Thomas W. Stringer (1815–1893) was an American Christian minister in the A.M.E. Church and a state senator in Mississippi. He helped organize churches, schools, and fraternal organizations. He was elected to the Mississippi Senate in 1869 and served from 1870 until 1871.

Stringer was born in Maryland, and raised at North Buxton, Ontario, a settlement of Black Canadians. He later moved to Ohio, where he was ordained a minister of the African Methodist Episcopal Church.

He moved to Vicksburg, Mississippi, after the American Civil War. He was an organizer at Mississippi's 1868 constitutional convention.

He is buried at the Vicksburg City Cemetery.

See also
Hiram Revels, another African-American U.S. Senator from Mississippi
Buxton National Historic Site and Museum

References

1815 births
1893 deaths
Mississippi state senators
People from Maryland
African-American state legislators in Mississippi
Politicians from Vicksburg, Mississippi
African-American politicians during the Reconstruction Era
Burials in Mississippi
19th-century American politicians
African Methodist Episcopal Church clergy
American expatriates in Canada
19th-century American Episcopalians
19th-century American clergy